Cyclops Steel (also known as Universal-Cyclops and for one of its main subsidiaries as Detroit Steel) was a steel company based in Pittsburgh, Pennsylvania. It was founded in nearby Bridgeville, Pennsylvania in 1908 as Universal Rolling Mill Company, and merged with Cyclops Steel Company founded in 1884 of the Western Pennsylvania city of Titusville in 1936. Cyclops Steel marketed to industries such as aerospace, automotive, business machines, chemical processing, communications equipment, construction, electronics, farm machinery, food processing equipment, home appliances and cutlery, industrial machinery, marine equipment, medical equipment, drilling and mining equipment, military equipment, power generation equipment, rail transportation, sports equipment and tools, ties and fixtures.

Not to be confused with Cyclops Steel Works in Sheffield, UK in the mid 1800s.

Led by Chairman and CEO William H. Knoell, Cyclops pursued a counter-cyclical strategy which helped it to diversify from steel. As a result, Cyclops purchased the Clairton, Pennsylvania based 16-chain Busy Beaver lumber stores in 1972, and the Silo Electronic Stores in 1980 for $35 million ($ in today's terms).

Cyclops and Colt's Manufacturing Company entered into a very public battle for a Colt steel mill in Midland, Pennsylvania during 1982.

In August, 1986 Cyclops shareholders rejected selling off its core steel mill business in favor of a management suggested re-focusing only on Silo & Busy Beaver retail stores.

In February 1987, Cyclops Steel was bought out by Alleghany Corporation for $494 million ($ in today's terms), as its 119-store Silo electronics outlets and 11-store Busy Beaver retailers are spun off into British based Dixons Group Ltd.

Notable visits 
In 1952: Dutch Prime Minister Willem Drees opened the second day of his three-day visit, stopping at the Cyclops Steel mill near Pittsburgh.
April, 1980: Senator and 1980 presidential candidate Edward Kennedy visits the Bridgeville, Pennsylvania mill on a campaign stop.

References

External links 
Universal Stainless

Rolling mills
Steel companies of the United States
Defunct companies based in Pennsylvania
Historic American Engineering Record in Pennsylvania
Bridge companies
Manufacturing companies based in Pittsburgh
1908 establishments in Pennsylvania
Construction and civil engineering companies established in 1908
American companies established in 1908